The UN Security Council Sanctions Committee on North Korea (formally named Security Council Committee Established Pursuant to Resolution 1718) is a subsidiary body established in 2006 by the UN Security Council's resolution 1718 in response to North Korea's first nuclear test and its other nuclear proliferation efforts.

Resolution 1718 imposed a series of economic sanctions on the DPRK and established a committee to gather more information, specify the sanctions, monitor them, and issue recommendations. The committee's responsibilities have broadened as subsequent resolutions expanded and strengthened sanctions, which include an arms embargo, a ban on luxury goods, financial sanctions, and limitations on export of mining resources.

A Panel of Experts (PoE) established in 2009 supports the work of the committee through expert analysis, particularly in evaluating cases of non-compliance. While the committee can make legally-binding decisions on how to specifically execute the sanctions (by naming which entities are targeted, for example),   the PoE only has an informational and advisory role in support of those decisions.

Establishment
The committee was established pursuant to resolution 1718 (2006) to oversee the relevant sanctions measures relating to the Democratic People's Republic of Korea (DPRK).

Excerpts of the UN Security Council Resolution 1718

Resolution 1718 (2006), Adopted by the Security Council at its 5551st meeting, on 14 October 2006.

Additional functions were entrusted to the committee in resolutions 1874 (2009), 2087 (2013), 2094 (2013), 2270 (2016), and 2321 (2016). In 2017, the committee began to track the procurement of DPRK coal by Member States. The committee is formed by representatives of all UNSC members.

Panel of experts
The committee is supported by a Panel of Experts (PoE) that was established in 2009 by UNSC resolution 1874, to assist the committee in carrying out its mandate; gather, examine and analyze information from States regarding the implementation of the measures (including incidents of non-compliance); make recommendations to improve implementation of the measures imposed; and issue reports.

It is composed of eight experts and is based in New York City. Its mandate has been extended annually through resolutions 1928 (2010), 1985 (2011), 2050 (2012), 2094 (2013), 2141 (2014), 2207 (2015), 2276 (2016), 2345 (2017), 2407 (2018), 2464 (2019), 2515 (2020), 2569 (2021), and 2627 (2022).

The panel acts under the direction of the committee and its members are appointed by the secretary-general of the United Nations in consultation with the committee. They have specialized backgrounds in areas such as nuclear issues, other weapons of mass destruction and conventional arms, customs and export controls, weapons of mass destruction arms control and non-proliferation policy, finance, maritime transport and missile technology.

Documents

Committee annual reports

Panel of experts reports

See also

Timeline of the North Korean nuclear program
List of United Nations Security Council resolutions concerning North Korea

References

External links
 List of Committee reports
 UN Security Council Committee Established Pursuant to Resolution 1718 (2006) (Reports issued by the UN Panel of Experts)
 Procurement of DPRK coal by Member States
 UN Security Council Documents for DPRK (North Korea) (UNSC Resolutions and statements)
 Procurement of DPRK coal by Member States (UN Statistics)
 Lists of Items Prohibited for Export to and Import from The Democratic People's Republic of Korea pursuant to Security Council Resolution 1718 (2006)

United Nations Security Council subsidiary organs
Sanctions against North Korea